Sione Fakaʻosilea (born 13 January 1987) is a rugby union player from  Tonga. He plays in the centre position for professional SuperLiga club Baia Mare.

He played for the Tonga national rugby sevens team in 2013 and went on to play for Romania's national 15-a-side team, making his international debut at the 2017 Rugby Europe Championship in a match against the Russian Medvedi.  However, after featuring in 13 internationals for Romania, including six in Rugby World Cup qualification matches for the 2019 Rugby World Cup, questions were raised over Fakaʻosilea's eligibility to represent Romania. As Fakaʻosilea had previously represented Tonga in Sevens rugby at the 2013 Gold Coast Sevens, this rendered him ineligible to represent Romania under World Rugby rules on switching nationalities.

Honours
Baia Mare
 SuperLiga: 2014

References

External links

 
 
 

1987 births
Living people
Romanian rugby union players
Romania international rugby union players
Tongan rugby union players
Tongan emigrants to Romania
Romanian people of Tongan descent
CSM Știința Baia Mare players
Rugby union centres